The Bergen Steamship Company (BDS), was founded in 1851 by Michael Krohn to operate a shipping service between the Norwegian ports of Bergen, Stavanger, and Kristiansand and the German port of Hamburg with the paddle steamer Bergen. The company funnel was black with three widely spaced narrow white bands.

BDS progressively expanded its routes to provide worldwide services. The company operated a regular passenger service from West Norway to the UK with Norwegian Government support from 1890, and took part in the Norwegian coastal service, the Hurtigruten, from 1894 until 1979. Cruise liners were run from 1921 until 1971 when BDS partnered Nordenfjeldske Dampskibsselskab in setting up the Royal Viking Line. At its height, between about 1920 and 1970, the company had up to 2500 employees.

During World War II several BDS ships were sunk by Allied action on the Norwegian coast, including  in which over 2500 people died.  According to the newspaper Bergens Tidende the Company profited highly from shipping contracts entered into with the German occupiers of Norway.  At the end of the war the Company's records were no longer in existence.  The Company's management was investigated by Bergen police for 18 months, but no charges were brought.

Under the name Bergen Line (not to be confused with the Bergen Line railway) passenger ships were operated between Newcastle, Stavanger, Haugesund and Bergen.  These continued after 1984 when the company was taken over by Kosmos Line.  After being sold again in 1988, the company lost any individual identity.

Fleet 

From a slow start the Company increased its ship numbers from 5 in 1875 to 20 in 1894 and over 45 by 1916 when unrestricted submarine warfare was introduced.  The numbers were then increased from 35 in 1918 to 55 by 1939, reduced to 35 by 1945, with a modest increase thereafter.

UK Passenger Service 

The UK passenger service ran between Newcastle and Bergen, with some sailings also calling at Stavanger and Haugesund.  From 1928 the service terminated at the purpose-built Tyne Commission Quay, North Shields, only two miles from the Tyne piers and now part of the Royal Quays complex.  The service continued after 1984 when the company was taken over by Kosmos Line. After being sold again in 1988, the company lost any individual identity.

On 14 June 1888 the Norwegian Parliament agreed to support a weekly mail service from Newcastle to Bergen and Trondheim.  Initially the service was provided jointly by the Bergen Line and Nordenfjeldske.  The Bergen Line vessel, Mercur, inaugurated the service, departing from Bergen on 31 May 1890 at 9 p.m., arriving in the Tyne early on 2 June.  In June 1893 the Bergen Line ship Venus, built on the Tyne by Swan Hunter, entered the service and remained on regular sailings until 1931.

In 1912 the Norwegian Government entered a contract with the two companies to increase the frequency of sailings to seven per week.  According to Kielhau this was achieved by August 1914 at the start of World War I when the Bergen Line's contribution was provided by Venus, Vega and Irma.  From August 22 of that year all British mail for the Far East was sent via Newcastle and Bergen and the route became the only safe one for the exchange of personnel between the Western Powers and their Russian ally.  In 1915 the service was joined by Jupiter, built at Gothenburg and twice the size of previous ships on the route.

Sailings were interrupted at the end of 1916 after four BDS ships including Vega had been intercepted and sunk by U-boats in two months; but Jupiter was chartered by the British Government at £30,000 per year, with the replacement cost set at £200,000, to continue a service between Aberdeen and Bergen with a British crew and under the British flag, with priority guaranteed in a British shipyard for building a replacement should Jupiter meet with an accident.  Normal regular services were restarted by Irma on 26 November 1918, followed by Jupiter on 18 January 1919.  Nordenfjeldske withdrew in October 1921 but sailings continued with Jupiter and Venus, joined by Leda, a sister to Jupiter powered by steam turbines, newly built on the Tyne in 1920 by Armstrong Whitworth.

She maintained the service with Jupiter during most of the 1930s. In 1936 the peak season was covered by Jupiter and Venus, each with two round trips weekly.

The two large twin-funnelled motorships maintained a summer service of four round trips per week until the outbreak of World War II, with departures from Bergen at 11.00 on Mondays, Wednesdays, Thursdays and Saturdays, and from Newcastle at 19.30 on Mondays, Tuesdays, Thursdays and Saturdays. Southbound trips from Bergen by Venus on Wednesdays and Saturdays, and northbound trips from the Tyne by Vega on Tuesdays and Saturdays also called at Stavanger and Haugesund.

By 1945 both Venus and Vega had been sunk while in German hands, and the service was re-opened with Lyra, a regular passenger service restarting in January 1946 on which she was joined by Astrea.  Jupiter took over from Lyra in March 1946.  Vega'''s main engines were salvaged in 1949 and installed in two ships, one of which continued in service until 1969.  Venus had been discovered sunk in Hamburg harbour in 1945 and judged capable of rebuilding, and she reappeared on the service in April 1948 with a larger profile which had the forecastle built one deck higher.  She maintained summer sailings from Newcastle and operated cruises from Plymouth to Madeira in the winters from December 1948 onwards, which also took advantage of the cargo opportunity provided by the import of fruit and vegetables to the UK.

From 1953 the service continued regularly for 15 years with Leda and Venus operating the summer service with up to five sailings per week, and Leda operating a twice-weekly winter service. Both ships were limited by their lack of drive-on car transport facilities, and Venus was withdrawn and broken up in 1968. Leda continued until its withdrawal in 1974 after steep rises in fuel prices.

Some timetables from the 1930s and 1950s are available on the web. Individual ship histories are also available.

 Hurtigruten 
The Hurtigruten opened in 1893 to convey passengers and cargo along the Norwegian coast, initially from Trondheim to Hammerfest, later from Bergen to Kirkenes. At the start there were almost no lighthouses and other navigational aids in the north, and navigation was often done with a compass, chart and stopwatch. By this time Bergenske Dampskibsselskab had sold its ships and withdrawn from the Hurtigruten. The Company contributed the following ships to the service from 1894 onwards:

 , 1894-1927
 SS Jupiter, 1896-1910,
 SS Orion, 1898-1903,; Wrecked and burnt
 SS Capella, 1898–1912,
 SS Astræa, 1900-1910,; Wrecked
 SS Lyra, 1905-1912,
 SS Midnatsol, 1910-1949,
 SS Hera, 1910-1931; Wrecked
 , 1912-1951
 SS Neptun, 1919-1921,
 MS Stella Polaris, 1927-2006,; Cruise Ship 1927 - 1969, Hotel Ship in Kisho Nishiura, Japan from 1969 - 2005, Sank while under tow to Europe in 2006
 SS Mira, 1928-1941,; War loss
 , 1937-1954; Sunk in Raftsundet
 SS Ariadne, 1939-1940 War loss
 MS Midnatsol, 1949-1982
 MS Nordlys, 1951-1983
 MS Polarlys, 1952–1993
 SS Jupiter, 1953-1955
 , 1956–present; withdrawn March 2012.

Photographs of most of these ships and others on the Hurtigruten can be found on the web.

Russo-Norwegian Navigation Company
In 1923, the Russo-Norwegian Navigation Company, Limited'' was organized in London with the Bergenske Steamship Company, Soviet Company Severoles, and the Russian agency Arcos as principal participants. Alexey Krylov was a member of the board, "mainly to participate in the inspection and testing of the acquired steamers and to monitor the building of the ordered ones." He described the operations of the joint company in his memoir.

The primary function of the company was to transport Russian timber from Arkhangelsk.

The company was dissolved in 1928.

References
 
Notes

Bibliography
 
 
 
 
 

Defunct shipping companies of Norway
Transport companies established in 1851
Transport companies disestablished in 1988
1988 disestablishments in Norway
Norwegian companies established in 1851